Lead poisoning, also known as plumbism and saturnism, is a type of metal poisoning caused by lead in the body. The brain is the most sensitive. Symptoms may include abdominal pain, constipation, headaches, irritability, memory problems, infertility, and tingling in the hands and feet. It causes almost 10% of intellectual disability of otherwise unknown cause and can result in behavioral problems. Some of the effects are permanent. In severe cases, anemia, seizures, coma, or death may occur.

Exposure to lead can occur by contaminated air, water, dust, food, or consumer products. Lead poisoning poses a significantly increased risk to children as they are far more likely to ingest lead indirectly by chewing on toys or other objects that are coated in lead paint. The amount of lead that can be absorbed by children is also higher than that of adults. Exposure at work is a common cause of lead poisoning in adults with certain occupations at particular risk. Diagnosis is typically by measurement of the blood lead level. The Centers for Disease Control and Prevention (US) has set the upper limit for blood lead for adults at 10 µg/dl (10 µg/100 g) and for children at 3.5 µg/dl, previously before October 2021 5 µg/dl Elevated lead may also be detected by changes in red blood cells or dense lines in the bones of children as seen on X-ray.

Lead poisoning is preventable. This includes individual efforts such as removing lead-containing items from the home, workplace efforts such as improved ventilation and monitoring, state and national policies that ban lead in products such as paint, gasoline, ammunition, wheel weights, and fishing weights, reduce allowable levels in water or soil, and provide for cleanup of contaminated soil. Workers' education could be helpful as well. The major treatments are removal of the source of lead and the use of medications that bind lead so it can be eliminated from the body, known as chelation therapy. Chelation therapy in children is recommended when blood levels are greater than 40–45 µg/dl. Medications used include dimercaprol, edetate calcium disodium, and succimer.

In 2016, lead is believed to have resulted in 540,000 deaths worldwide. It occurs most commonly in the developing world. There also are numerous cases in the developed world, with there being thousands of American communities with higher lead burdens than seen during the peak of the Flint water crisis. Those who are poor are at greater risk. Lead is believed to result in 0.6% of the world's disease burden. According to a study, half of the US population has been exposed to substantially detrimental lead levels in early childhood – mainly from car exhaust whose lead pollution peaked in the 1970s and caused widespread loss in cognitive ability.

People have been mining and using lead for thousands of years. Descriptions of lead poisoning date to at least 2000 BC, while efforts to limit lead's use date back to at least the 16th century. Concerns for low levels of exposure began in the 1970s with there being no safe threshold for lead exposure.

Classification

Classically, "lead poisoning" or "lead intoxication" has been defined as exposure to high levels of lead typically associated with severe health effects. Poisoning is a pattern of symptoms that occur with toxic effects from mid to high levels of exposure; toxicity is a wider spectrum of effects, including subclinical ones (those that do not cause symptoms). However, professionals often use "lead poisoning" and "lead toxicity" interchangeably, and official sources do not always restrict the use of "lead poisoning" to refer only to symptomatic effects of lead.

The amount of lead in the blood and tissues, as well as the time course of exposure, determine toxicity.

Lead poisoning may be acute (from intense exposure of short duration) or chronic (from repeat low-level exposure over a prolonged period), but the latter is much more common.

Diagnosis and treatment of lead exposure are based on blood lead level (the amount of lead in the blood), measured in micrograms of lead per deciliter of blood (μg/dL). Urine lead levels may be used as well, though less commonly. In cases of chronic exposure, lead often sequesters in the highest concentrations first in the bones, then in the kidneys. If a provider is performing a provocative excretion test, or "chelation challenge", a measurement obtained from urine rather than blood is likely to provide a more accurate representation of total lead burden to a skilled interpreter.

The US Centers for Disease Control and Prevention and the World Health Organization state that a blood lead level of 10 μg/dL or above is a cause for concern; however, lead may impair development and have harmful health effects even at lower levels, and there is no known safe exposure level. Authorities such as the American Academy of Pediatrics define lead poisoning as blood lead levels higher than 10 μg/dL.

Lead forms a variety of compounds and exists in the environment in various forms. Features of poisoning differ depending on whether the agent is an organic compound (one that contains carbon), or an inorganic one. Organic lead poisoning is now very rare, because countries across the world have phased out the use of organic lead compounds as gasoline additives, but such compounds are still used in industrial settings. Organic lead compounds, which cross the skin and respiratory tract easily, affect the central nervous system predominantly.

Signs and symptoms

Lead poisoning can cause a variety of symptoms and signs which vary depending on the individual and the duration of lead exposure. Symptoms are nonspecific and may be subtle, and someone with elevated lead levels may have no symptoms. Symptoms usually develop over weeks to months as lead builds up in the body during a chronic exposure, but acute symptoms from brief, intense exposures also occur.

Symptoms from exposure to organic lead, which is probably more toxic than inorganic lead due to its lipid solubility, occur rapidly. Poisoning by organic lead compounds has symptoms predominantly in the central nervous system, such as insomnia, delirium, cognitive deficits, tremor, hallucinations, and convulsions.

Symptoms may be different in adults and children; the main symptoms in adults are headache, abdominal pain, memory loss, kidney failure, male reproductive problems, and weakness, pain, or tingling in the extremities.

Early symptoms of lead poisoning in adults are commonly nonspecific and include depression, loss of appetite, intermittent abdominal pain, nausea, diarrhea, constipation, and muscle pain. Other early signs in adults include malaise, fatigue, decreased libido, and problems with sleep. An unusual taste in the mouth and personality changes are also early signs.

In adults, symptoms can occur at levels above 40 μg/dL, but are more likely to occur only above 50–60 μg/dL. Symptoms begin to appear in children generally at around 60 μg/dL. However, the lead levels at which symptoms appear vary widely depending on unknown characteristics of each individual. At blood lead levels between 25 and 60 μg/dL, neuropsychiatric effects such as delayed reaction times, irritability, and difficulty concentrating, as well as slowed motor nerve conduction and headache can occur. Anemia may appear at blood lead levels higher than 50 μg/dL. In adults, abdominal colic, involving paroxysms of pain, may appear at blood lead levels greater than 80 μg/dL. Signs that occur in adults at blood lead levels exceeding 100 μg/dL include wrist drop and foot drop,  and signs of encephalopathy (a condition characterized by brain swelling), such as those that accompany increased pressure within the skull, delirium, coma, seizures, and headache. In children, signs of encephalopathy such as bizarre behavior, discoordination, and apathy occur at lead levels exceeding 70 μg/dL. For both adults and children, it is rare to be asymptomatic if blood lead levels exceed 100 μg/dL.

Acute poisoning
In acute poisoning, typical neurological signs are pain, muscle weakness, numbness and tingling, and, rarely, symptoms associated with inflammation of the brain. Abdominal pain, nausea, vomiting, diarrhea, and constipation are other acute symptoms. Lead's effects on the mouth include astringency and a metallic taste. Gastrointestinal problems, such as constipation, diarrhea, poor appetite, or weight loss, are common in acute poisoning. Absorption of large amounts of lead over a short time can cause shock (insufficient fluid in the circulatory system) due to loss of water from the gastrointestinal tract. Hemolysis (the rupture of red blood cells) due to acute poisoning can cause anemia and hemoglobin in the urine. Damage to kidneys can cause changes in urination such as  acquired fanconi syndrome and decreased urine output. People who survive acute poisoning often go on to display symptoms of chronic poisoning.

Chronic poisoning
Chronic poisoning usually presents with symptoms affecting multiple systems, but is associated with three main types of symptoms: gastrointestinal, neuromuscular, and neurological. Central nervous system and neuromuscular symptoms usually result from intense exposure, while gastrointestinal symptoms usually result from exposure over longer periods. Signs of chronic exposure include loss of short-term memory or concentration, depression, nausea, abdominal pain, loss of coordination, and numbness and tingling in the extremities. Fatigue, problems with sleep, headaches, stupor, slurred speech, and anemia are also found in chronic lead poisoning. A "lead hue" of the skin with pallor and/or lividity is another feature. A blue line along the gum with bluish black edging to the teeth, known as a Burton line, is another indication of chronic lead poisoning. Children with chronic poisoning may refuse to play or may have hyperkinetic or aggressive behavior disorders. Visual disturbance may present with gradually progressing blurred vision as a result of central scotoma, caused by toxic optic neuritis.

Effects on children

A pregnant woman who has elevated blood lead levels is at greater risk of a premature birth or with a low birth weight. Children are more at risk for lead poisoning because their smaller bodies are in a continuous state of growth and development. Young children are much more vulnerable to lead poisoning, as they absorb 4 to 5 times more lead than an adult from a given source. Furthermore, children, especially as they are learning to crawl and walk, are constantly on the floor and therefore more prone to ingesting and inhaling dust that is contaminated with lead.

The classic signs and symptoms in children are loss of appetite, abdominal pain, vomiting, weight loss, constipation, anemia, kidney failure, irritability, lethargy, learning disabilities, and behavioral problems. Slow development of normal childhood behaviors, such as talking and use of words, and permanent intellectual disability are both commonly seen. Although less common, it is possible for fingernails to develop leukonychia striata if exposed to abnormally high lead concentrations.

On July 30, 2020, a report by UNICEF and Pure Earth revealed that lead poisoning is affecting children on a "massive and previously unknown scale". According to the report, one in three children, up to 800 million globally, have blood lead levels at, or above, 5 micrograms per decilitre (µg/dL), the amount at which action is required.

By organ system
Lead affects every one of the body's organ systems, especially the nervous system, but also the bones and teeth, the kidneys, and the cardiovascular, immune, and reproductive systems. Hearing loss and tooth decay have been linked to lead exposure, as have cataracts. Intrauterine and neonatal lead exposure promote tooth decay. Aside from the developmental effects unique to young children, the health effects experienced by adults are similar to those in children, although the thresholds are generally higher.

Kidneys
Kidney damage occurs with exposure to high levels of lead, and evidence suggests that lower levels can damage kidneys as well. The toxic effect of lead causes nephropathy and may cause Fanconi syndrome, in which the proximal tubular function of the kidney is impaired. Long-term exposure at levels lower than those that cause lead nephropathy have also been reported as nephrotoxic in patients from developed countries that had chronic kidney disease or were at risk because of hypertension or diabetes mellitus.
Lead poisoning inhibits excretion of the waste product urate and causes a predisposition for gout, in which urate builds up. This condition is known as saturnine gout.

Cardiovascular system
Evidence suggests lead exposure is associated with high blood pressure, and studies have also found connections between lead exposure and coronary heart disease, heart rate variability, and death from stroke, but this evidence is more limited. People who have been exposed to higher concentrations of lead may be at a higher risk for cardiac autonomic dysfunction on days when ozone and fine particles are higher.

Reproductive system
Lead affects both the male and female reproductive systems. In men, when blood lead levels exceed 40 μg/dL, sperm count is reduced and changes occur in volume of sperm, their motility, and their morphology.
A pregnant woman's elevated blood lead level can lead to miscarriage, prematurity, low birth weight, and problems with development during childhood. Lead is able to pass through the placenta and into breast milk, and blood lead levels in mothers and infants are usually similar. A fetus may be poisoned in utero if lead from the mother's bones is subsequently mobilized by the changes in metabolism due to pregnancy; increased calcium intake in pregnancy may help mitigate this phenomenon.

Nervous system

Lead affects the peripheral nervous system (especially motor nerves) and the central nervous system. Peripheral nervous system effects are more prominent in adults and central nervous system effects are more prominent in children. Lead causes the axons of nerve cells to degenerate and lose their myelin coats.

Lead exposure in young children has been linked to learning disabilities, and children with blood lead concentrations greater than 10 μg/dL are in danger of developmental disabilities. Increased blood lead level in children has been correlated with decreases in intelligence, nonverbal reasoning, short-term memory, attention, reading and arithmetic ability, fine motor skills, emotional regulation, and social engagement.

The effect of lead on children's cognitive abilities takes place at very low levels. There is apparently no lower threshold to the dose-response relationship (unlike other heavy metals such as mercury). Reduced academic performance has been associated with lead exposure even at blood lead levels lower than 5 μg/dL. Blood lead levels below 10 μg/dL have been reported to be associated with lower IQ and behavior problems such as aggression, in proportion with blood lead levels. Between the blood lead levels of 5 and 35 μg/dL, an IQ decrease of 2–4 points for each μg/dL increase is reported in children. However, studies that show associations between low-level lead exposure and health effects in children may be affected by confounding and overestimate the effects of low-level lead exposure.

High blood lead levels in adults are also associated with decreases in cognitive performance and with psychiatric symptoms such as depression and anxiety. It was found in a large group of current and former inorganic lead workers in Korea that blood lead levels in the range of 20–50 μg/dL were correlated with neuro-cognitive defects. Increases in blood lead levels from about 50 to about 100 μg/dL in adults have been found to be associated with persistent, and possibly permanent, impairment of central nervous system function.

Lead exposure in children is also correlated with neuropsychiatric disorders such as attention deficit hyperactivity disorder and anti-social behaviour. Elevated lead levels in children are correlated with higher scores on aggression and delinquency measures. A correlation has also been found between prenatal and early childhood lead exposure and violent crime in adulthood. Countries with the highest air lead levels have also been found to have the highest murder rates, after adjusting for confounding factors. A May 2000 study by economic consultant Rick Nevin theorizes that lead exposure explains 65% to 90% of the variation in violent crime rates in the US. A 2007 paper by the same author claims to show a strong association between preschool blood lead and subsequent crime rate trends over several decades across nine countries. Lead exposure in childhood appears to increase school suspensions and juvenile detention among boys. It is believed that the U.S. ban on lead paint in buildings in the late 1970s, as well as the phaseout of leaded gasoline in the 1970s and 1980s, partially helped contribute to the decline of violent crime in the United States since the early 1990s.

Exposure routes

Lead is a common environmental pollutant. Causes of environmental contamination include lead-based paint that is deteriorating (e.g. peeling, chipping, chalking, cracking, damp or damage), renovation, repair or painting activities (disturbing or demolishing painted surfaces generate toxic lead dust 
),  industrial use of lead, such as found in facilities that process lead-acid batteries or produce lead wire or pipes, and metal recycling and foundries. Storage batteries and ammunition are made with the largest amounts of lead consumed in the economy each year, in the US as of 2013. Children living near facilities that process lead, such as lead smelters, have been found to have unusually high blood lead levels. In August 2009, parents rioted in China after lead poisoning was found in nearly 2000 children living near zinc and manganese smelters. Lead exposure can occur from contact with lead in air, household dust, soil, water, and commercial products. Leaded gasoline has also been linked to increases in lead pollution. Some research has suggested a link between leaded gasoline and crime rates. Man made lead pollution has been elevated in the air for the past 2000 years. Lead pollution in the air is entirely due to human activity (mining and smelting, as well as in gasoline).

Occupational exposure

In adults, occupational exposure is the main cause of lead poisoning. People can be exposed when working in facilities that produce a variety of lead-containing products; these include radiation shields, ammunition, certain surgical equipment, developing dental X-ray films prior to digital X-rays (each film packet had a lead liner to prevent the radiation from going through), fetal monitors, plumbing, circuit boards, jet engines, and ceramic glazes. In addition, lead miners and smelters, plumbers and fitters, auto mechanics, glass manufacturers, construction workers, battery manufacturers and recyclers, firing range workers, and plastic manufacturers are at risk for lead exposure. Other occupations that present lead exposure risks include welding, manufacture of rubber, printing, zinc and copper smelting, processing of ore, combustion of solid waste, and production of paints and pigments. Lead exposure can also occur with intense use of gun ranges, regardless of whether these ranges are indoor or out. Parents who are exposed to lead in the workplace can bring lead dust home on clothes or skin and expose their children. Occupational exposure to lead increases the risk of cardiovascular disease, in particular: stroke, and high blood pressure.

Food 
Lead may be found in food when food is grown in soil that is high in lead, airborne lead contaminates the crops, animals eat lead in their diet, or lead enters the food either from what it was stored or cooked in. Ingestion of lead paint and batteries is also a route of exposure for livestock, which can subsequently affect humans. Milk produced by contaminated cattle can be diluted to a lower lead concentration and sold for consumption.

In Bangladesh, lead compounds have been added to turmeric to make it more yellow. This is believed to have started in the 1980s and continues . It is believed to be one of the main sources of high lead levels in the country. In Hong Kong the maximum allowed lead parts per million is 6 in solid foods and 1 in liquid foods.

Paint
Some lead compounds are colorful and are used widely in paints, and lead paint is a major route of lead exposure in children. A study conducted in 1998–2000 found that 38 million housing units in the US had lead-based paint, down from a 1990 estimate of 64 million. Deteriorating lead paint can produce dangerous lead levels in household dust and soil. Deteriorating lead paint and lead-containing household dust are the main causes of chronic lead poisoning. The lead breaks down into the dust and since children are more prone to crawling on the floor, it is easily ingested. Many young children display pica, eating things that are not food. Even a small amount of a lead-containing product such as a paint chip or a sip of glaze can contain tens or hundreds of milligrams of lead. Eating chips of lead paint presents a particular hazard to children, generally producing more severe poisoning than occurs from dust. Because removing lead paint from dwellings, e.g. by sanding or torching, creates lead-containing dust and fumes, it is generally safer to seal the lead paint under new paint (excepting moveable windows and doors, which create paint dust when operated). Alternatively, special precautions must be taken if the lead paint is to be removed.

In oil painting, it was once common for colours such as yellow or white to be made with lead carbonate. Lead white oil colour was the main white of oil painters until superseded by compounds containing zinc or titanium in the mid-20th century. It is speculated that the painter Caravaggio and possibly Francisco Goya and Vincent Van Gogh had lead poisoning due to overexposure or carelessness when handling this colour.

Soil

Residual lead in soil contributes to lead exposure in urban areas. It has been thought that the more polluted an area is with various contaminants, the more likely it is to contain lead. However, this is not always the case, as there are several other reasons for lead contamination in soil.

Lead content in soil may be caused by broken-down lead paint, residues from lead-containing gasoline, used engine oil, tire weights, or pesticides used in the past, contaminated landfills, or from nearby industries such as foundries or smelters. For example, in the Montevideo neighborhood of La Teja, former industrial sites became important sources of exposure in local communities in the early 2000s. Although leaded soil is less of a problem in countries that no longer have leaded gasoline, it remains prevalent, raising concerns about the safety of urban agriculture; eating food grown in contaminated soil can present a lead hazard. Interfacial solar evaporation has been recently studied as a technique for remediating lead-contaminated sites, which involves the evaporation of heavy metal ions from moist soil.

Water
Lead from the atmosphere or soil can end up in groundwater and surface water. It is also potentially in drinking water, e.g. from plumbing and fixtures that are either made of lead or have lead solder. Since acidic water breaks down lead in plumbing more readily, chemicals can be added to municipal water to increase the pH and thus reduce the corrosivity of the public water supply. Chloramines, which were adopted as a substitute for chlorine disinfectants due to fewer health concerns, increase corrositivity. In the US, 14–20% of total lead exposure is attributed to drinking water. In 2004, a team of seven reporters from The Washington Post discovered high levels of lead in the drinking water in Washington, DC, and won an award for investigative reporting for a series of articles about this contamination. In the water crisis in Flint, Michigan, a switch to a more corrosive municipal water source caused elevated lead levels in domestic tap water.

Like Flint MI and Washington DC, a similar situation affects the State of Wisconsin, where estimates call for replacement of up to 176,000 underground pipes made of lead known as lead service lines. The city of Madison, Wisconsin addressed the issue and replaced all of their lead service lines, but there are still others that have yet to follow suit. While there are chemical methods that could help reduce the amount of lead in the water distributed, a permanent fix would be to replace the pipes completely. While the state may replace the pipes below ground, it will be up to the homeowners to replace the pipes on their property, at an average cost of $3,000. Experts say that if the city were to replace their pipes and the citizens were to keep the old pipes located within their homes, there would be a potential for more lead to dissolve into their drinking water. The U.S. Congress authorized the EPA to dedicate funds to assist states and nonprofits with the costs of lead service line removal under Section 50105 of the Safe Drinking Water Act. 
 
Collected rainwater from roof runoff used as potable water may contain lead, if there are lead contaminants on the roof or in the storage tank. The Australian Drinking Water Guidelines allow a maximum of 0.01 mg/L (10 ppb) lead in water.

Lead wheel weights have been found to accumulate on roads and interstates and erode in traffic entering the water runoff through drains. Leaded fishing weights accumulate in rivers, streams, ponds, and lakes.

Gasoline 
Tetraethyllead was first added to gasoline in 1923, as it helped prevent engine knocking. Automotive exhaust represented a major way for lead to be inhaled, invade the bloodstream and pass into the brain.

The use of lead in gasoline peaked in the 1970s. By the next decade most high incomes countries prohibited the use of leaded petrol. As late as 2002, almost all low- and middle-income countries including some OECD members still used it. The  UN Environment Programme (UNEP) thus launched a campaign in 2002 to eliminate its use, leading to Algeria being the last country to stop its use in July 2021.

Lead-containing products
Lead can be found in products such as kohl, an ancient cosmetic from the Middle East, South Asia, and parts of Africa that has many other names; and from some toys. In 2007, millions of toys made in China were recalled from multiple countries owing to safety hazards including lead paint. Vinyl mini-blinds, found especially in older housing, may contain lead.
Lead is commonly incorporated into herbal remedies such as Indian Ayurvedic preparations and remedies of Chinese origin. There are also risks of elevated blood lead levels caused by folk remedies like azarcon and greta, which each contain about 95% lead.

Ingestion of metallic lead, such as small lead fishing lures, increases blood lead levels and can be fatal. Ingestion of lead-contaminated food is also a threat. Ceramic glaze often contains lead, and dishes that have been improperly fired can leach the metal into food, potentially causing severe poisoning. In some places, the solder in cans used for food contains lead. When manufacturing medical instruments and hardware, solder containing lead may be present. People who eat animals hunted with lead bullets may be at risk for lead exposure. Bullets lodged in the human body rarely cause significant levels of lead, but bullets lodged in the joints are the exception, as they deteriorate and release lead into the body over time.

In May 2015, Indian food safety regulators in the state of Uttar Pradesh found that samples of Maggi 2 Minute Noodles contained lead up to 17 times beyond permissible limits. On 3 June 2015, the New Delhi Government banned the sale of Maggi noodles in New Delhi stores for 15 days because it was found to contain lead beyond the permissible limit. The Gujarat FDA on 4 June 2015 banned the noodles for 30 days after 27 out of 39 samples were detected with objectionable levels of metallic lead, among other things. Some of India's biggest retailers like Future Group, Big Bazaar, Easyday and Nilgiris have imposed a nationwide ban on Maggi noodles. Many other states too have banned Maggi noodles.

Bullets
Contact with ammunition is a source of lead exposure. As of 2013, lead-based ammunition production is the second largest annual use of lead in the US, accounting for over 84,800 metric tons consumed in 2013, second only to the manufacture of storage batteries. The Environmental Protection Agency (EPA) cannot regulate cartridges and shells, as a matter of law. Lead birdshot is banned in some areas, but this is primarily for the benefit of the birds and their predators, rather than humans. Contamination from heavily used gun ranges is of concern to those who live near by.  Non-lead alternatives include copper, zinc, steel, tungsten-nickel-iron, bismuth-tin, and polymer blends such as tungsten-polymer and copper-polymer.

Because game animals can be shot using lead bullets, the potential for lead ingestion from game meat consumption has been studied clinically and epidemiologically. In a recent study conducted by the CDC, a cohort from North Dakota was enrolled and asked to self-report historical consumption of game meat, and participation in other activities that could cause lead exposure. The study found that participants' age, sex, housing age, current hobbies with potential for lead exposure, and game consumption were all associated with blood lead level (PbB).

According to a study published in 2008, 1.1% of the 736 persons consuming wild game meat tested had PbB ≥5 μg/dl In November 2015 The US HHS/CDC/NIOSH designated 5 µg/dL (five micrograms per deciliter) of whole blood, in a venous blood sample, as the reference blood lead level for adults. An elevated BLL is defined as a BLL ≥5 µg/dL. This case definition is used by the ABLES program, the Council of State and Territorial Epidemiologists (CSTE), and CDC's National Notifiable Diseases Surveillance System (NNDSS). Previously (i.e. from 2009 until November 2015), the case definition for an elevated BLL was a BLL ≥10 µg/dL.

 
To virtually eliminate the potential for lead contamination, some researchers have suggested the use of lead-free copper non-fragmenting bullets.

Bismuth is an element used as a lead-replacement for shotgun pellets used in waterfowl hunting although shotshells made from bismuth are nearly ten times the cost of lead.

Opium 
Lead contaminated opium has been the source of poisoning in Iran and other Middle Eastern countries.  This has also appeared in the illicit narcotic supply in North America, resulting in confirmed lead poisoning.

Pathophysiology

Exposure occurs through inhalation, ingestion or occasionally skin contact. Lead may be taken in through direct contact with mouth, nose, and eyes (mucous membranes), and through breaks in the skin. Tetraethyllead, which was a gasoline additive and is still used in aviation gasoline, passes through the skin; and other forms of lead, including inorganic lead are also absorbed through skin. The main sources of absorption of inorganic lead are from ingestion and inhalation. In adults, about 35–40% of inhaled lead dust is deposited in the lungs, and about 95% of that goes into the bloodstream. Of ingested inorganic lead, about 15% is absorbed, but this percentage is higher in children, pregnant women, and people with deficiencies of calcium, zinc, or iron. Infants may absorb about 50% of ingested lead, but little is known about absorption rates in children.

The main body tissues that store lead are the blood, soft tissues, and bone; the half-life of lead in these tissues is measured in weeks for blood, months for soft tissues, and years for bone. Lead in the bones, teeth, hair, and nails is bound tightly and not available to other tissues, and is generally thought not to be harmful. In adults, 94% of absorbed lead is deposited in the bones and teeth, but children only store 70% in this manner, a fact which may partially account for the more serious health effects on children. The half-life of lead in bone has been estimated as years to decades, and bone can introduce lead into the bloodstream long after the initial exposure is gone.  The half-life of lead in the blood in men is about 40 days, but it may be longer in children and pregnant women, whose bones are undergoing remodeling, which allows the lead to be continuously re-introduced into the bloodstream. Also, if lead exposure takes place over years, clearance is much slower, partly due to the re-release of lead from bone. Many other tissues store lead, but those with the highest concentrations (other than blood, bone, and teeth) are the brain, spleen, kidneys, liver, and lungs.
Lead is removed from the body very slowly, mainly through urine. Smaller amounts of lead are also eliminated through the feces, and very small amounts in hair, nails, and sweat.

Lead has no known physiologically relevant role in the body, and its harmful effects are myriad. Lead and other heavy metals create reactive radicals which damage cell structures including DNA and cell membranes. Lead also interferes with DNA transcription, enzymes that help in the synthesis of vitamin D, and enzymes that maintain the integrity of the cell membrane. Anemia may result when the cell membranes of red blood cells become more fragile as the result of damage to their membranes. Lead interferes with metabolism of bones and teeth and alters the permeability of blood vessels and collagen synthesis. Lead may also be harmful to the developing immune system, causing production of excessive inflammatory proteins; this mechanism may mean that lead exposure is a risk factor for asthma in children. Lead exposure has also been associated with a decrease in activity of immune cells such as polymorphonuclear leukocytes. Lead also interferes with the normal metabolism of calcium in cells and causes it to build up within them.

Enzymes

The primary cause of lead's toxicity is its interference with a variety of enzymes because it binds to sulfhydryl groups found on many enzymes. Part of lead's toxicity results from its ability to mimic other metals that take part in biological processes, which act as cofactors in many enzymatic reactions, displacing them at the enzymes on which they act. Lead is able to bind to and interact with many of the same enzymes as these metals but, due to its differing chemistry, does not properly function as a cofactor, thus interfering with the enzyme's ability to catalyze its normal reaction or reactions. Among the essential metals with which lead interacts are calcium, iron, and zinc.

The lead ion has a lone pair in its electronic structure, which can result in a distortion in the coordination of ligands, and in 2007 was hypothesized to be important in lead poisoning's effects on enzymes (see ).

One of the main causes for the pathology of lead is that it interferes with the activity of an essential enzyme called delta-aminolevulinic acid dehydratase, or ALAD (see image of the enzyme structure), which is important in the biosynthesis of heme, the cofactor found in hemoglobin. Lead also inhibits the enzyme ferrochelatase, another enzyme involved in the formation of heme. Ferrochelatase catalyzes the joining of protoporphyrin and Fe2+ to form heme. Lead's interference with heme synthesis results in production of zinc protoporphyrin and the development of anemia. Another effect of lead's interference with heme synthesis is the buildup of heme precursors, such as aminolevulinic acid, which may be directly or indirectly harmful to neurons. Elevation of aminolevulinic acid results in lead poisoning having symptoms similar to acute porphyria.

Neurons

The brain is the organ most sensitive to lead exposure. Lead is able to pass through the endothelial cells at the blood brain barrier because it can substitute for calcium ions and be taken up by calcium-ATPase pumps. Lead poisoning interferes with the normal development of a child's brain and nervous system; therefore children are at greater risk of lead neurotoxicity than adults are. In a child's developing brain, lead interferes with synapse formation  in the cerebral cortex, neurochemical development (including that of neurotransmitters), and organization of ion channels. It causes loss of neurons' myelin sheaths, reduces numbers of neurons, interferes with neurotransmission, and decreases neuronal growth.

Lead-ions (Pb), like magnesium-ions (Mg), block NMDA receptors. Therefore, an increase in Pb concentration will effectively inhibit ongoing long-term potentiation (LTP), and lead to an abnormal increase in long-term depression (LTD) on neurons in the affected parts of the nervous system. These abnormalities lead to the indirect downregulation of NMDA-receptors, effectively initiating a positive feedback-loop for LTD. The targeting of NMDA receptors is thought to be one of the main causes for lead's toxicity to neurons.

Diagnosis
Diagnosis includes determining the clinical signs and the medical history, with inquiry into possible routes of exposure. Clinical toxicologists, medical specialists in the area of poisoning, may be involved in diagnosis and treatment.

The main tool in diagnosing and assessing the severity of lead poisoning is laboratory analysis of the blood lead level (BLL).

Blood film examination may reveal basophilic stippling of red blood cells (dots in red blood cells visible through a microscope), as well as the changes normally associated with iron-deficiency anemia (microcytosis and hypochromasia). This may be known as sideroblastic anemia. However, basophilic stippling is also seen in unrelated conditions, such as megaloblastic anemia caused by vitamin B12 (colbalamin) and folate deficiencies.
Contrary to other sideroblastic anemia, there are no ring sideroblasts in a bone marrow smear.

Exposure to lead also can be evaluated by measuring erythrocyte protoporphyrin (EP) in blood samples. EP is a part of red blood cells known to increase when the amount of lead in the blood is high, with a delay of a few weeks. Thus EP levels in conjunction with blood lead levels can suggest the time period of exposure; if blood lead levels are high but EP is still normal, this finding suggests exposure was recent. However, the EP level alone is not sensitive enough to identify elevated blood lead levels below about 35 μg/dL. Due to this higher threshold for detection and the fact that EP levels also increase in iron deficiency, use of this method for detecting lead exposure has decreased.

Blood lead levels are an indicator mainly of recent or current lead exposure, not of total body burden. Lead in bones can be measured noninvasively by X-ray fluorescence; this may be the best measure of cumulative exposure and total body burden. However this method is not widely available and is mainly used for research rather than routine diagnosis. Another radiographic sign of elevated lead levels is the presence of radiodense lines called lead lines at the metaphysis in the long bones of growing children, especially around the knees. These lead lines, caused by increased calcification due to disrupted metabolism in the growing bones, become wider as the duration of lead exposure increases. X-rays may also reveal lead-containing foreign materials such as paint chips in the gastrointestinal tract.

Fecal lead content that is measured over the course of a few days may also be an accurate way to estimate the overall amount of childhood lead intake. This form of measurement may serve as a useful way to see the extent of oral lead exposure from all the diet and environmental sources of lead.

Lead poisoning shares symptoms with other conditions and may be easily missed. Conditions that present similarly and must be ruled out in diagnosing lead poisoning include carpal tunnel syndrome, Guillain–Barré syndrome, renal colic, appendicitis, encephalitis in adults, and viral gastroenteritis in children. Other differential diagnoses in children include constipation, abdominal colic, iron deficiency, subdural hematoma, neoplasms of the central nervous system, emotional and behavior disorders, and intellectual disability.

Reference levels
The current reference range for acceptable blood lead concentrations in healthy persons without excessive exposure to environmental sources of lead is less than 3.5 µg/dL for children. It was less than 25 µg/dL for adults. Previous to 2012 the value for children was 10 (µg/dl). Lead-exposed workers in the U.S. are required to be removed from work when their level is greater than 50 µg/dL if they do construction and otherwise greater than 60 µg/dL.

In 2015, US HHS/CDC/NIOSH designated 5 µg/dL (five micrograms per deciliter) of whole blood, in a venous blood sample, as the reference blood lead level for adults. An elevated BLL is defined as a BLL ≥5 µg/dL. This case definition is used by the ABLES program, the Council of State and Territorial Epidemiologists (CSTE), and CDC's National Notifiable Diseases Surveillance System (NNDSS). Previously (i.e. from 2009 until November 2015), the case definition for an elevated BLL was a BLL ≥10 µg/dL. The U.S. national BLL geometric mean among adults was 1.2 μg/dL in 2009–2010.

Blood lead concentrations in poisoning victims have ranged from 30 to 80 µg/dL in children exposed to lead paint in older houses, 77–104 µg/dL in persons working with pottery glazes, 90–137 µg/dL in individuals consuming contaminated herbal medicines, 109–139 µg/dL in indoor shooting range instructors and as high as 330 µg/dL in those drinking fruit juices from glazed earthenware containers.

Prevention

In most cases, lead poisoning is preventable by avoiding exposure to lead. Prevention strategies can be divided into individual (measures taken by a family), preventive medicine (identifying and intervening with high-risk individuals), and public health (reducing risk on a population level).

Recommended steps by individuals to reduce the blood lead levels of children include increasing their frequency of hand washing and their intake of calcium and iron, discouraging them from putting their hands to their mouths, vacuuming frequently, and eliminating the presence of lead-containing objects such as blinds and jewellery in the house. In houses with lead pipes or plumbing solder, these can be replaced. Less permanent but cheaper methods include running water in the morning to flush out the most contaminated water, or adjusting the water's chemistry to prevent corrosion of pipes. Lead testing kits are commercially available for detecting the presence of lead in the household. Testing kit accuracy depends on the user testing all layers of paint and the quality of the kit; the US Environmental Protection Agency (EPA) only approves kits with an accuracy rating of at least 95%. Professional lead testing companies caution that DIY test kits can create health risks for users that do not understand their limitations and liability issues for employers with regard to worker protection. As hot water is more likely than cold water to contain higher amounts of lead, use only cold water from the tap for drinking, cooking, and making baby formula.  Since most of the lead in household water usually comes from plumbing in the house and not from the local water supply, using cold water can avoid lead exposure. Measures such as dust control and household education do not appear to be effective in changing children's blood levels.

Prevention measures also exist on national and municipal levels. Recommendations by health professionals for lowering childhood exposures include banning the use of lead where it is not essential and strengthening regulations that limit the amount of lead in soil, water, air, household dust, and products. Regulations exist to limit the amount of lead in paint; for example, a 1978 law in the US restricted the lead in paint for residences, furniture, and toys to 0.06% or less. In October 2008, the US EPA reduced the allowable lead level by a factor of ten to 0.15 micrograms per cubic meter of air, giving states five years to comply with the standards. The European Union's Restriction of Hazardous Substances Directive limits amounts of lead and other toxic substances in electronics and electrical equipment. In some places, remediation programs exist to reduce the presence of lead when it is found to be high, for example in drinking water. As a more radical solution, entire towns located near former lead mines have been "closed" by the government, and the population resettled elsewhere, as was the case with Picher, Oklahoma, in 2009. Removing lead from airplane fuel would also be useful.

Screening
Screening may be an important method of prevention for those at high risk, such as those who live near lead-related industries. The USPSTF has stated that general screening of those without symptoms include children and pregnant women is of unclear benefit . The ACOG and APP, however, recommends asking about risk factors and testing those who have them.

Education 
The education of workers on lead, its danger and how its workplace exposure can be decreased, especially when initial blood lead level and urine lead level are high, could help reduce the risk of lead poisoning in the workplace.

Treatment

The mainstays of treatment are removal from the source of lead and, for people who have significantly high blood lead levels or who have symptoms of poisoning, chelation therapy. Treatment of iron, calcium, and zinc deficiencies, which are associated with increased lead absorption, is another part of treatment for lead poisoning. When lead-containing materials are present in the gastrointestinal tract (as evidenced by abdominal X-rays), whole bowel irrigation, cathartics, endoscopy, or even surgical removal may be used to eliminate it from the gut and prevent further exposure. Lead-containing bullets and shrapnel may also present a threat of further exposure and may need to be surgically removed if they are in or near fluid-filled or synovial spaces. If lead encephalopathy is present, anticonvulsants may be given to control seizures, and treatments to control swelling of the brain include corticosteroids and mannitol. Treatment of organic lead poisoning involves removing the lead compound from the skin, preventing further exposure, treating seizures, and possibly chelation therapy for people with high blood lead concentrations.

Before the advent of organic chelating agents, salts of iodide were given orally, such as heavily popularized by Louis Melsens and many nineteenth and early twentieth century doctors.

A chelating agent is a molecule with at least two negatively charged groups that allow it to form complexes with metal ions with multiple positive charges, such as lead. The chelate that is thus formed is nontoxic and can be excreted in the urine, initially at up to 50 times the normal rate. The chelating agents used for treatment of lead poisoning are edetate disodium calcium (CaNa2EDTA), dimercaprol (BAL), which are injected, and succimer and d-penicillamine, which are administered orally.

Chelation therapy is used in cases of acute lead poisoning, severe poisoning, and encephalopathy, and is considered for people with blood lead levels above 25 µg/dL. While the use of chelation for people with symptoms of lead poisoning is widely supported, use in asymptomatic people with high blood lead levels is more controversial. Chelation therapy is of limited value for cases of chronic exposure to low levels of lead. Chelation therapy is usually stopped when symptoms resolve or when blood lead levels return to premorbid levels. When lead exposure has taken place over a long period, blood lead levels may rise after chelation is stopped because lead is leached into blood from stores in the bone; thus repeated treatments are often necessary.

People receiving dimercaprol need to be assessed for peanut allergies since the commercial formulation contains peanut oil. Calcium EDTA is also effective if administered four hours after the administration of dimercaprol. Administering dimercaprol, DMSA (Succimer), or DMPS prior to calcium EDTA is necessary to prevent the redistribution of lead into the central nervous system. Dimercaprol used alone may also redistribute lead to the brain and testes. An adverse side effect of calcium EDTA is renal toxicity. Succimer (DMSA) is the preferred agent in mild to moderate lead poisoning cases. This may be the case in instances where children have a blood lead level >25μg/dL. The most reported adverse side effect for succimer is gastrointestinal disturbances. It is also important to note that chelation therapy only lowers blood lead levels and may not prevent the lead-induced cognitive problems associated with lower lead levels in tissue. This may be because of the inability of these agents to remove sufficient amounts of lead from tissue or inability to reverse preexisting damage.

Chelating agents can have adverse effects; for example, chelation therapy can lower the body's levels of necessary nutrients like zinc. Chelating agents taken orally can increase the body's absorption of lead through the intestine.

Chelation challenge, also known as provocation testing, is used to indicate an elevated and mobilizable body burden of heavy metals including lead. This testing involves collecting urine before and after administering a one-off dose of chelating agent to mobilize heavy metals into the urine. Then urine is analyzed by a laboratory for levels of heavy metals; from this analysis overall body burden is inferred. Chelation challenge mainly measures the burden of lead in soft tissues, though whether it accurately reflects long-term exposure or the amount of lead stored in bone remains controversial. Although the technique has been used to determine whether chelation therapy is indicated and to diagnose heavy metal exposure, some evidence does not support these uses as blood levels after chelation are not comparable to the reference range typically used to diagnose heavy metal poisoning. The single chelation dose could also redistribute the heavy metals to more sensitive areas such as central nervous system tissue.

Epidemiology
Since lead has been used widely for centuries, the effects of exposure are worldwide. Environmental lead is ubiquitous, and everyone has some measurable blood lead level. Atmospheric lead pollution increased dramatically beginning in the 1950s as a result of the widespread use of leaded gasoline. Lead is one of the largest environmental medicine problems in terms of numbers of people exposed and the public health toll it takes. Lead exposure accounts for about 0.2% of all deaths and 0.6% of disability adjusted life years globally.

Although regulation reducing lead in products has greatly reduced exposure in the developed world since the 1970s, lead is still allowed in products in many developing countries. According to the World Health Organization, as of June 2022, only 45% of countries had confirmed legally-binding controls on production and use of lead paint. Significant disparities exist in the enactment of bans, with regions such as the Middle East, North Africa, and Sub-Saharan Africa currently the most likely to have countries lacking such measures. Despite phase out in many parts of the Global North, Global South exposure has increased by nearly three times. In all countries that have banned leaded gasoline, average blood lead levels have fallen sharply. However, some developing countries still allow leaded gasoline, which is the primary source of lead exposure in most developing countries. Beyond exposure from gasoline, the frequent use of pesticides in developing countries adds a risk of lead exposure and subsequent poisoning. Poor children in developing countries are at especially high risk for lead poisoning. Of North American children, 7% have blood lead levels above 10 μg/dL, whereas among Central and South American children, the percentage is 33–34%. About one fifth of the world's disease burden from lead poisoning occurs in the Western Pacific, and another fifth is in Southeast Asia.

In developed countries, people with low levels of education living in poorer areas are most at risk for elevated lead. In the US, the groups most at risk for lead exposure are the impoverished, city-dwellers, and immigrants. African-American children and those living in old housing have also been found to be at elevated risk for high blood lead levels in the US. Low-income people often live in old housing with lead paint, which may begin to peel, exposing residents to high levels of lead-containing dust.

Risk factors for elevated lead exposure include alcohol consumption and smoking (possibly because of contamination of tobacco leaves with lead-containing pesticides). Adults with certain risk factors might be more susceptible to toxicity; these include calcium and iron deficiencies, old age, disease of organs targeted by lead (e.g. the brain, the kidneys), and possibly genetic susceptibility. 
Differences in vulnerability to lead-induced neurological damage between males and females have also been found, but some studies have found males to be at greater risk, while others have found females to be.

In adults, blood lead levels steadily increase with increasing age. In adults of all ages, men have higher blood lead levels than women do. Children are more sensitive to elevated blood lead levels than adults are. Children may also have a higher intake of lead than adults; they breathe faster and may be more likely to have contact with and ingest soil. Children of ages one to three tend to have the highest blood lead levels, possibly because at that age they begin to walk and explore their environment, and they use their mouths in their exploration. Blood levels usually peak at about 18–24 months old. In many countries including the US, household paint and dust are the major route of exposure in children.

Notable cases

Cases of mass lead poisoning can occur. 15,000 people are being relocated from Jiyuan in central Henan province to other locations after 1000 children living around China's largest smelter plant (owned and operated by Yuguang Gold and Lead) were found to have excess lead in their blood. The total cost of this project is estimated to around 1 billion yuan ($150 million). 70% of the cost will be paid by local government and the smelter company, while the rest will be paid by the residents themselves. The government has suspended production at 32 of 35 lead plants. The affected area includes people from 10 different villages.

The Zamfara State lead poisoning epidemic occurred in Nigeria in 2010. As of 5 October 2010 at least 400 children have died from the effects of lead poisoning.

Sex-specific susceptibility
Neuroanatomical pathology due to lead exposure is more pronounced in males, suggesting that lead-related toxicity has a disparate impact across sexes.

Prognosis

Reversibility
Outcome is related to the extent and duration of lead exposure. Effects of lead on the physiology of the kidneys and blood are generally reversible; its effects on the central nervous system are not. While peripheral effects in adults often go away when lead exposure ceases, evidence suggests that most of lead's effects on a child's central nervous system are irreversible. Children with lead poisoning may thus have adverse health, cognitive, and behavioral effects that follow them into adulthood.

Encephalopathy
Lead encephalopathy is a medical emergency and causes permanent brain damage in 70–80% of children affected by it, even those that receive the best treatment. The mortality rate for people who develop cerebral involvement is about 25%, and of those who survive who had lead encephalopathy symptoms by the time chelation therapy was begun, about 40% have permanent neurological problems such as cerebral palsy.

Long-term
Exposure to lead may also decrease lifespan and have health effects in the long term. Death rates from a variety of causes have been found to be higher in people with elevated blood lead levels; these include cancer, stroke, and heart disease, and general death rates from all causes. Lead is considered a possible human carcinogen based on evidence from animal studies. Evidence also suggests that age-related mental decline and psychiatric symptoms are correlated with lead exposure. Cumulative exposure over a prolonged period may have a more important effect on some aspects of health than recent exposure. Some health effects, such as high blood pressure, are only significant risks when lead exposure is prolonged (over about one year). Furthermore, the neurological effects of lead exposure have been shown to be exacerbated and long lasting in low income children in comparison to those of higher economic standing. This does not imply that being wealthy can prevent lead from causing long-term mental health issues.

Violence 

Lead poisoning in children has been linked to changes in brain function that can result in low IQ, and increased impulsivity and aggression. These traits of childhood lead exposure are associated with crimes of passion, such as aggravated assault in young adults. An increase in lead exposure in children was linked to an increase in aggravated assault rates 22 years later. For instance, the peak in leaded gasoline use in the late 1970s corresponds to a peak in aggravated assault rates in the late 1990s in urban areas across the United States.

History

Lead poisoning was among the first known and most widely studied work regarding environmental hazards. One of the first metals to be smelted and used, lead is thought to have been discovered and first mined in Anatolia around 6500 BC. Its density, workability, and corrosion resistance were among the metal's attractions.

In the 2nd century BC the Greek botanist Nicander described the colic and paralysis seen in lead-poisoned people. Dioscorides, a Greek physician who lived in the 1st century AD, wrote that lead makes the mind "give way".

Lead was used extensively in Roman aqueducts from about 500 BC to 300 AD. Julius Caesar's engineer, Vitruvius, reported, "water is much more wholesome from earthenware pipes than from lead pipes. For it seems to be made injurious by lead, because white lead is produced by it, and this is said to be harmful to the human body." Gout, prevalent in affluent Rome, is thought to be the result of lead, or leaded eating and drinking vessels.  Sugar of lead (lead(II) acetate) was used to sweeten wine, and the gout that resulted from this was known as "saturnine" gout. It is even hypothesized that lead poisoning may have contributed to the decline of the Roman Empire, a hypothesis thoroughly disputed:

However, recent research supports the idea that the lead found in the water came from the supply pipes, rather than another source of contamination. It was not unknown for locals to punch holes in the pipes to draw water off, increasing the number of people exposed to the lead.

Romans also consumed lead through the consumption of defrutum, carenum, and sapa, musts made by boiling down fruit in lead cookware. Defrutum and its relatives were used in ancient Roman cuisine and cosmetics, including as a food preservative. The use of leaden cookware, though popular, was not the general standard and copper cookware was used far more generally. There is also no indication how often sapa was added or in what quantity.

The consumption of sapa as having a role in the fall of the Roman Empire was used in a theory proposed by geochemist Jerome Nriagu to state that "lead poisoning contributed to the decline of the Roman Empire". In 1984, John Scarborough, a pharmacologist and classicist, criticized the conclusions drawn by Nriagu's book as "so full of false evidence, miscitations, typographical errors, and a blatant flippancy regarding primary sources that the reader cannot trust the basic arguments."

After antiquity, mention of lead poisoning was absent from medical literature until the end of the Middle Ages. In 1656 the German physician Samuel Stockhausen recognized dust and fumes containing lead compounds as the cause of disease, called since ancient Roman times morbi metallici, that were known to afflict miners, smelter workers, potters, and others whose work exposed them to the metal.

The painter Caravaggio might have died of lead poisoning. Bones with high lead levels were recently found in a grave thought likely to be his. Paints used at the time contained high amounts of lead salts. Caravaggio is known to have exhibited violent behavior, a symptom commonly associated with lead poisoning.

In 17th-century Germany, the physician Eberhard Gockel discovered lead-contaminated wine to be the cause of an epidemic of colic. He had noticed that monks who did not drink wine were healthy, while wine drinkers developed colic, and traced the cause to sugar of lead, made by simmering litharge with vinegar. As a result, Eberhard Ludwig, Duke of Württemberg issued an edict in 1696 banning the adulteration of wines with litharge.

In the 18th century lead poisoning was fairly frequent on account of the widespread drinking of rum, which was made in stills with a lead component (the "worm"). It was a significant cause of mortality amongst slaves and sailors in the colonial West Indies. Lead poisoning from rum was also noted in Boston. Benjamin Franklin suspected lead to be a risk in 1786. Also in the 18th century, "Devonshire colic" was the name given to the symptoms experienced by people of Devon who drank cider made in presses that were lined with lead. Lead was added to cheap wine illegally in the 18th and early 19th centuries as a sweetener. The composer Beethoven, a heavy wine drinker, had elevated lead levels (as later detected in his hair) possibly due to this; the cause of his death is controversial, but lead poisoning is a contender as a factor.

With the Industrial Revolution in the 19th century, lead poisoning became common in the work setting. The introduction of lead paint for residential use in the 19th century increased childhood exposure to lead; for millennia before this, most lead exposure had been occupational. The first legislation in the UK to limit pottery workers' exposure to lead was included in the Factories Act Extension Act in 1864, with further introduced in 1899. William James Furnival (1853–1928), research ceramist of City & Guilds London Institute, appeared before Parliament in 1901 and presented a decade's evidence to convince the nation's leaders to remove lead completely from the British ceramic industry. His 852-page treatise, Leadless Decorative Tiles, Faience, and Mosaic of 1904 published that campaign and provided recipes to promote lead-free ceramics.  At the request of the Illinois state government in the US, Alice Hamilton (1869–1970) documented lead toxicity in Illinois industry and in 1911 presented results to the 23rd Annual Meeting of the American Economic Association. Hamilton was a founder of the field of occupational safety and health and published the first edition of her manual, Industrial Toxicology in 1934, yet in print in revised forms. An important step in the understanding of childhood lead poisoning occurred when toxicity in children from lead paint was recognized in Australia in 1897. France, Belgium, and Austria banned white lead interior paints in 1909; the League of Nations followed suit in 1922. However, in the United States, laws banning lead house paint were not passed until 1971,and it was phased out and not fully banned until 1978.

The 20th century saw an increase in worldwide lead exposure levels due to the increased widespread use of the metal. Beginning in the 1920s, lead was added to gasoline to improve its combustion; lead from this exhaust persists today in soil and dust in buildings. Midcentury ceramicist Carol Janeway provides a case history of lead poisoning in an artist using lead glazes in decorating tiles in the 1940s; her monograph suggests that other artists' potential for lead poisoning be investigated, for example Vally Wieselthier and Dora Carrington. Blood lead levels worldwide have been declining sharply since the 1980s, when leaded gasoline began to be phased out. In those countries that have banned lead in solder for food and drink cans and have banned leaded gasoline additives, blood lead levels have fallen sharply since the mid-1980s.

The levels found today in most people are orders of magnitude greater than those of pre-industrial society. Due to reductions of lead in products and the workplace, acute lead poisoning is rare in most countries today, but low-level lead exposure is still common. It was not until the second half of the 20th century that subclinical lead exposure became understood to be a problem. During the end of the 20th century, the blood lead levels deemed acceptable steadily declined. Blood lead levels once considered safe are now considered hazardous, with no known safe threshold.

In the late 1950s through the 1970s Herbert Needleman and Clair Cameron Patterson did research trying to prove lead's toxicity to humans. In the 1980s Needleman was falsely accused of scientific misconduct by the lead industry associates.

In 2002 Tommy Thompson, secretary of Health and Human Services appointed at least two persons with conflicts of interest to the CDC's Lead Advisory Committee.

In 2014 a case by the state of California against a number of companies decided against Sherwin-Williams, NL Industries and ConAgra and ordered them to pay $1.15 billion. The disposition of The People v. ConAgra Grocery Products Company et al. in the California 6th Appellate District Court on 14 November 2017 is that:

On 6 December 2017, the petitions for rehearing from NL Industries, Inc., ConAgra Grocery Products Company and The Sherwin-Williams Company were denied.

Studies have found a weak link between lead from leaded gasoline and crime rates.

 in the United States lead paint in rental housing remains a hazard to children. Both landlords and insurance companies have adopted strategies which limit the chance of recovery for damages due to lead poisoning: insurance companies by excluding coverage for lead poisoning from policies and landlords by crafting barriers to collection of any money damages compensating plaintiffs for damage.

Other species

Humans are not alone in suffering from lead's effects; plants and animals are also affected by lead toxicity to varying degrees depending on species. Animals experience many of the same effects of lead exposure as humans do, such as abdominal pain, peripheral neuropathy, and behavioral changes such as increased aggression. Much of what is known about human lead toxicity and its effects is derived from animal studies. Animals are used to test the effects of treatments, such as chelating agents, and to provide information on the pathophysiology of lead, such as how it is absorbed and distributed in the body.

Farm animals such as cows and horses as well as pet animals are also susceptible to the effects of lead toxicity. Sources of lead exposure in pets can be the same as those that present health threats to humans sharing the environment, such as paint and blinds, and there is sometimes lead in toys made for pets. Lead poisoning in a pet dog may indicate that children in the same household are at increased risk for elevated lead levels.

Wildlife

Lead, one of the leading causes of toxicity in waterfowl, has been known to cause die-offs of wild bird populations. When hunters use lead shot, waterfowl such as ducks can ingest the spent pellets later and be poisoned; predators that eat these birds are also at risk. Lead shot-related waterfowl poisonings were first documented in the US in the 1880s. By 1919, the spent lead pellets from waterfowl hunting was positively identified as the source of waterfowl deaths. Lead shot has been banned for hunting waterfowl in several countries, including the US in 1991 and Canada in 1997. Other threats to wildlife include lead paint, sediment from lead mines and smelters, and lead weights from fishing lines. Lead in some fishing gear has been banned in several countries.

The critically endangered California condor has also been affected by lead poisoning. As scavengers, condors eat carcasses of game that have been shot but not retrieved, and with them the fragments from lead bullets; this increases their lead levels. Among condors around the Grand Canyon, lead poisoning due to eating lead shot is the most frequently diagnosed cause of death. In an effort to protect this species, in areas designated as the California condor's range the use of projectiles containing lead has been banned to hunt deer, feral pigs, elk, pronghorn antelope, coyotes, ground squirrels, and other non-game wildlife. Also, conservation programs exist which routinely capture condors, check their blood lead levels, and treat cases of poisoning.

See also
 Lead-based paint in the United States
 Lead in Drinking Water Incidents
 Sick building syndrome

Notes

References

Further reading

External links 

 

 
 
 
 
 

 
Environmental impact by effect
Occupational diseases
Mass poisoning
Disturbances of human pigmentation
Intellectual disability
Biology of attention deficit hyperactivity disorder
Wikipedia medicine articles ready to translate